Manuel Bacigalupo (25 December 1916 – 10 June 1965) was a Peruvian cyclist. He competed in the individual and team road race events at the 1936 Summer Olympics.

References

External links
 

1916 births
1965 deaths
Peruvian male cyclists
Olympic cyclists of Peru
Cyclists at the 1936 Summer Olympics
Sportspeople from Lima
20th-century Peruvian people